This is a list of dams and reservoirs in Austria.

References

Dams in Austria

Austria
Dams and reservoirs